The Chen Tian-lai Residence is a historic former house in Datong District, Taipei, Taiwan.

History
The house was built in the 1920s as the residence of Chen Tian-lai, a wealthy tea merchant at that time. By 2017, the house was jointly owned by more than 30 people and had fallen into disrepair, as the owners could not agree on how to repair it. In 2020, the Taipei government took over the building and announced plans to restore it and surrounding property by 2024.

Architecture
The house was constructed with Baroque architecture style with a grandiose facade. There is a pond in its backyard.

See also
 List of tourist attractions in Taiwan

References

Baroque architecture in Taipei
Houses in Taiwan
Tourist attractions in Taipei